Huasco may refer to:

Huasco Province
Huasco River
Huasco, Chile
Salar del Huasco